The canton of Monts is an administrative division of the Indre-et-Loire department, central France. It was created at the French canton reorganisation which came into effect in March 2015. Its seat is in Monts.

It consists of the following communes:
 
Artannes-sur-Indre
Esvres
Montbazon
Monts
Pont-de-Ruan
Saint-Branchs
Sorigny
Truyes
Veigné
Villeperdue

References

Cantons of Indre-et-Loire